Viorel is a Romanian male given name, derived from viorea (meaning the sweet violet flower).

Its female forms are Violeta and Viorica.

Notable people with the name
 Viorel P. Barbu (born 1941), Romanian mathematician
 Viorel Cataramă (born 1955), Romanian businessman and politician
 Viorel Cosma (1923 –  2017), Romanian musician and musicologist
 Viorel Gherciu (born 1969), Moldovan politician
 Viorel Hrebenciuc (born 1953), Romanian politician and statistician
 Viorel Ion, Romanian footballer
 Viorel Tilea, Romanian diplomat

External links
 BehindTheName.com: Entry for Viorel

Moldovan masculine given names
Romanian masculine given names